Adolf Vinnen was a five-masted barquentine that was built by Friedrich Krupp Germaniawerft, Kiel, Germany. She was wrecked on her maiden voyage in 1923.

Description
Adolf Vinnen was a  five-masted barquentine. She was propelled by sails and two  4-cylinder diesel engines. She was designed for a crew of 45.

History
Adolf Vinnen was built in 1922 by Friedrich Krupp Germaniawerft, Kiel. Launched in December 1922, she was yard number 420. She was built for F A Vinnen & Co, Bremen.

She was one of the five Vinnen sisters, identical ships built by Krupps around 1921-1922 for F A Vinnen of Bremen. These were the Carl Vinnen, Adolf Vinnen, Christle Vinnen, Werner Vinnen and Sussane Vinnen. The four masted steel auxilary, Magdalene Vinnen was a 3476 ton barque constructed to a separate design in the same year and in the same yard.

On 9 February 1923, during her maiden voyage from Kiel Germany to Barry, Glamorgan, Wales, Adolf Vinnen was driven ashore at Bass Point, Cornwall, United Kingdom in a gale. The Lizard lifeboat attended the ship, Her crew of 24 was rescued by breeches buoy from the cliffs above the wreck. Adolf Vinnen was the last large sailing ship wrecked in the Lizard area.

References

1922 ships
Barquentines
Merchant ships of Germany
Maritime incidents in February 1923
Shipwrecks in the English Channel
Cornish shipwrecks